Coccocarpia is a genus of lichen-forming fungi in the family Coccocarpiaceae.

Species
 Coccocarpia adnata 
 Coccocarpia albida 
 Coccocarpia delicatula 
 Coccocarpia dissecta 
 Coccocarpia erythroxyli 
 Coccocarpia gallaicoi 
 Coccocarpia glaucina 
 Coccocarpia kerguelensis 
 Coccocarpia melloniorum 
 Coccocarpia microphyllina 
 Coccocarpia molybdaea 
 Coccocarpia neglecta 
 Coccocarpia palmicola 
 Coccocarpia pellita 
 Coccocarpia prostrata 
 Coccocarpia pruinosa 
 Coccocarpia smaragdina 
 Coccocarpia stellata 
 Coccocarpia tomentosa

References

Gallery

Peltigerales
Lichen genera
Peltigerales genera
Taxa described in 1827
Taxa named by Christiaan Hendrik Persoon